Tumbling, sometimes referred to as power tumbling, is a gymnastics discipline in which participants perform a series of acrobatic skills down a  long sprung track. Each series, known as a pass, comprises eight elements in which the athlete jumps, twists and flips placing only their hands and feet on the track. Tumblers are judged on the difficulty and form of their routine. There are both individual and team competitions in the sport.

Tumbling can also refer more generally to similar acrobatic skills performed on their own or in other gymnastics events, such as in floor exercises or on the balance beam.

Tumbling is governed by the FIG, the International Federation of Gymnastics, and is included as an event within trampoline gymnastics. Although tumbling is not currently an Olympic event, elite tumblers competing at the international level can compete in various events organised by the FIG, continental confederations as well as at the European Games and World Games.

History
While the origins of tumbling are unknown, ancient records have shown acts of tumbling in many parts of the world including China, India, Japan, Egypt and Iran. Tumbling became part of the educational system of ancient Greece, from which early Romans borrowed the exercise for use in military training. During the Middle Ages, minstrels incorporated tumbling into their performances, and multiple records show tumblers performed for royal courts for entertainment. It is at the end of this period in 1303 that the verb tumble is first attested in this sense in English. There was renewed interest in formalised physical education during the Renaissance, and shortly thereafter gymnastics began to be introduced into some physical education programmes, such as in Prussia as early as 1776. The FIG was officially formed in 1881, then known as the European Gymnastics Federation. Tumbling, however, was not governed by the FIG until 1999. Before this time, the International Trampoline Federation governed the sport since its founding in 1964. National federations have even longer histories, such as the Amateur Athletic Union of the United States which included tumbling in events as early as 1886.

Tumbling has only been included as an official event in one Olympic games, the 1932 Summer Olympics, and was exclusively a men's event. It was around this time that the floor exercise, which includes many elements of tumbling, became an individual event at the Olympics.

Tumbling has been an event at the World Games since the event's founding in 1980, first appearing at the 1981 World Games.

In the United States
The Amateur Athletic Union of the United States has included tumbling since 1886 and added women's tumbling in 1938.

The National Collegiate Athletic Association previously included tumbling as an event, but removed it in 1962 to emphasise artistic gymnastics. More recently in 2019 the NCAA recommended acrobatics and tumbling be added as a sport to the Emerging Sports for Women program, and this addition became official in the 2020–21 school year.

FIG competitions

Equipment
The main piece of equipment used in tumbling is the tumbling track. The track is sprung and padded to assist the gymnasts during their pass. There are three lines running the length of the track. The middle line marks the centre of the track. Although part of the track extends beyond these lines, a pass is considered interrupted if a gymnast touches the track outside these lines.

Before the tumbling track, there is a run-up area on which the gymnasts can generate speed before beginning their pass. This run-up area measures  in length and should be the same height as the track itself.

At the end of the tumbling track there is a mat called the landing area.

If desired, the gymnast may use a vaulting board to begin their pass. This may be placed either on the tumbling track or the run-up.

Format
Tumbling competitions consist of two rounds. The first of these is a qualifying round for all participants, and the second is the final round for the top eight participants or teams. In the qualifying round, every participant performs two passes. In the final round, individual competitors perform an additional two passes while teams perform one pass per member. Each pass comprises eight elements. The first element of a pass may begin on the run-up but must land on the tumbling track. Passes are only allowed to move in the direction of the landing area, with the exception of the final element which may be performed in the opposite direction. A pass must have at least 3 elements to be scored and can be considered interrupted for a variety of reasons, such as the gymnast being out of bounds, the spotter touching the gymnast or a fall during the pass. All passes must end with a somersault, meaning the gymnast must flip at least once in the final skill.

In each round, a participant is not allowed to repeat the same element, with some exceptions. Some common moves with low point value are excluded from this rule. Elements can differ by the number of somersaults, twists or even the position of the gymnast's body. The same element may be repeated if it is preceded by a different element, and a skill with at least two somersaults and a twist may be repeated if the twist happens in a different phase of the skill. For instance, a double somersault with a twist may be repeated if the twist happens during the first somersault in one element and during the second somersault in the other.

Federations are allowed to add requirements to the passes in the qualifying round or even make a particular pass required. At FIG events special requirements are placed on the qualifying passes such that the first pass does not award any difficulty points for twists greater than a half-twist and the second does not award difficulty points for the final element if it does not include at least a full twist and deducts points for not including two somersault skills with at least a full twist each thereby focusing the first pass on somersaults and the second on twisting. As a result, these passes are respectively known as the salto pass and twisting pass.

Scoring
Tumbling passes are judged on two major components: difficulty and execution. Both are calculated to the tenth of a point. Scores are determined by a panel of eight judges. Two judges are responsible for the difficulty score. Five are responsible for the execution score. And one oversees the panel and handles miscellaneous or contested judging issues.

Difficulty judges are given competition cards before the gymnast performs this pass. These cards lay out the intended skills of the pass, and these judges are responsible for deducting points when the gymnast fails to perform the intended skills. Each skill has a pre-defined point value. Common connecting skills such as round-offs and handsprings have low difficulty values, and cartwheels have no value at all. Somersaults are given difficulty points based on how many flips and twists the gymnast performs and the position of their body during the skill.

Difficulty scores are consistent throughout all types of competitions with two exceptions. In youth competitions, skills have a maximum difficulty score of 4.3. In women's competitions, there is a 1.0-point bonus for each additional element with a difficulty value of at least 2.0 beyond the first.

Execution is scored based on each element's form, control, height and rhythm as well as the form and stability of the landing. Deductions are calculated independently by all five judges and taken from the maximum score of 10.0 points. The largest and smallest scores are ignored and the remaining scores are added together. At FIG events, this process of taking the middle three scores is done per element rather than per judge.

The gymnast's final score comes from adding the 3 execution scores and the difficulty score and subtracting any penalties incurred for things such as improper dress, improper procedure or an improper pass. Final scores are rounded to three decimal places.

Banned skills
In youth competitions, quadruple somersaults are banned. Performing this skill will result in the gymnast being disqualified from the competition.

Tumbling skills

FIG World Championship results

Men's individual
All results correct according to FIG database. Records only available from 2007.

Women's individual
All results correct according to FIG database. Records only available from 2007.

FIT Era World Champions

Men

Women

World Games results

Men

Women

Other notable tumblers

See also
 Men's tumbling at the 1932 Summer Olympics

References

External links
FIG Trampoline and Tumbling Homepage
FIG Trampoline Gymnastics Code of Points
FIG Apparatus Norms
USA Gymnastics Tumbling Homepage
UEG Trampoline and Tumbling Homepage
British Gymnastics Discover Tumbling Homepage

Gymnastics
Individual sports
Trampolining